Isaac ben Dorbolo was a rabbi, about 1150.

He traveled much, and knew Poland, Russia, Bohemia, France, and Germany from his own observations. Some time after 1140 he visited Rabbeinu Tam in Ramerupt.

In Worms, where he remained for some time, he reports having seen a responsum from the rabbis of Palestine in answer to a question addressed to them in 960 (at the time of Emperor Otto I) by the Rhenish rabbis concerning the reported appearance of the Messiah. Though this responsum is mentioned in different sources, its historical character has been questioned.

Several additions to the Maḥzor Vitry are in the name of Isaac Dorbolo; he is not the compiler of the Maḥzor, as Charles Taylor supposes. They are indicated either by the author's full name or by a simple ת (= Tosefet). According to Leopold Zunz, Isaac's father is identical with the correspondent of Rashi and the martyr of the First Crusade of the same name; but this is chronologically impossible. Rapoport wrongly connected Isaac with Rabbi Isaac of Ourville, author of the lost Sefer ha-Menahel; and Solomon Marcus Schiller-Szinessy, with Isaac of Russia.

Isaac is also mentioned in the Sefer Asufot, in Shibbolei haLeket, and in Kol Bo.

References

 Its bibliography:
Gross, in Berliner's Magazin, x. 75;
Introduction to the Maḥzor Vitry, ed. Hurwitz, p. 36;
Perles, in Grätz Jubelschrift, p. 31;
Berliner, ib., pp. 176, 177;
Epstein, in Monatsschrift, xli. 307;
Charles Taylor, Appendix to The Sayings of the Jewish Fathers, pp. 12 et seq., Cambridge, 1900.

12th-century French rabbis
French Orthodox rabbis
12th-century explorers
Jewish explorers